Marany Meyer (born 5 April 1984) is a South African and New Zealand (since 2009) chess Woman International Master.

Biography
In 2000, Marany Meyer won the South African Youth Chess Championship for girls. She represented South Africa at the World Youth Chess Championships in different age groups. In 2000, Marany Meyer participated in Women's World Chess Championship by knock-out system and in the first round sensational won to Nino Gurieli but in the second round lost to Almira Skripchenko. Later Marany Meyer moved to New Zealand and since 2009 she has been representing this country in chess tournaments.

Marany Meyer played for South Africa and New Zealand in the Women's Chess Olympiads:
 In 2000, for South Africa, at second board in the 34th Chess Olympiad (women) in Istanbul (+4, =2, -5),
 In 2012, for New Zealand at reserve board in the 40th Chess Olympiad (women) in Istanbul (+4, =2, -3),
 In 2014, for New Zealand, at second board in the 41st Chess Olympiad (women) in Tromsø (+4, =2, -3).

References

External links
 

Marany Meyer chess games at 365Chess.com

1984 births
Living people
South African female chess players
New Zealand chess players
Chess Woman International Masters
Chess Olympiad competitors
South African emigrants to New Zealand